Veritas Vincit is a 1919 German silent historical film directed by Joe May and starring Mia May, Johannes Riemann, and Magnus Stifter. It was made as an epic in three episodes, similar to D. W. Griffith's Intolerance. The first takes place in Ancient Rome, the second during the Renaissance and the third shortly before the First World War. Although not released until Spring 1919, it had been made during the final months of the war the previous year.

The film's sets were designed by the art directors Paul Leni and Siegfried Wroblewsky. It was shot at the Weissensee Studios in Berlin and on location around the city.

Cast
 Mia May as Helena / Ellinor / Komtessa Helene 
 Johannes Riemann as Lucfius / Ritter Lutz von Ehrenfried / Prinz Ludwig 
 Magnus Stifter as Decius 
 Emil Albes as Flavius 
 Wilhelm Diegelmann as Tullulus 
 Ferry Sikla as Fucius Asinius 
 Paul Biensfeldt as Digulus 
 Georg John as Blinder Senator 
 Leopold Bauer as Meister Heinrich, der Goldschmied 
 Lina Paulsen as Ursula 
 Friedrich Kühne as Florian 
 Bernhard Goetzke as Inder 
 Adolf Klein as Fürst 
 Olga Engl as Fürstin 
 Joseph Klein as General von der Tanne 
 Max Laurence as Untersuchungsrichter 
 Anders Wikman as Vicomte Rene de Montmorte 
 Hermann Picha as Zauberin 
 Emmy Wyda
 Maria Forescu
 Max Gülstorff as Wilddieb

References

Bibliography
 Hake, Sabine. German National Cinema. Routledge, 2002.
 Kreimeier, Klaus. The UFA Story: A Story of Germany's Greatest Film Company 1918-1945. University of California Press, 1999.

External links

1919 films
Films of the Weimar Republic
German silent feature films
Films directed by Joe May
German black-and-white films
1910s historical drama films
German historical drama films
UFA GmbH films
1919 drama films
Silent historical drama films
1910s German films
Films shot at Weissensee Studios
1910s German-language films